An atelier is the workshop of an artist in the fine or decorative arts.

Atelier or l'Atelier may also refer to:

 Atelier (video game series), a video game series by Gust Corporation
 Atelier (TV series), a Japanese/American series distributed by Netflix
 Atelier (building), a residential condominium skyscraper located in Midtown Manhattan

See also
 Théâtre de l'Atelier, Paris
 Éditions de l'Atelier, a French publishing house founded as Éditions Ouvrières in 1939
 Atelier Bow-Wow, a Tokyo-based architecture firm
 Den Atelier, a Luxembourg music venue